Fissurella rosea, common name the rosy keyhole limpet, is a species of sea snail, a marine gastropod mollusk in the family Fissurellidae, the keyhole limpets.

Description
The size of the shell varies between 17 mm and 40 mm.

Distribution
This species occurs in the Caribbean Sea, the Gulf of Mexico and off the Lesser Antilles; in the Atlantic Ocean off Southern Brasil.

References

 Rosenberg, G.; Moretzsohn, F.; García, E. F. (2009). Gastropoda (Mollusca) of the Gulf of Mexico, Pp. 579–699 in: Felder, D.L. and D.K. Camp (eds.), Gulf of Mexico–Origins, Waters, and Biota. Texas A&M Press, College Station, Texas.

External links
 

Fissurellidae
Gastropods described in 1791
Taxa named by Johann Friedrich Gmelin